The 2006 Iowa Senate election was held on  November 7, 2006.  The Senate seats for the twenty-five odd-numbered districts were up for election.  Senate terms are staggered such that half the membership is elected every two years.  Senators serve four-year terms.  Prior to the election, the Senate was evenly divided between Republicans and Democrats.  Following the election, the Democrats were in the majority - this marked the first time in 42 years that the Democrats had controlled both branches of the Iowa General Assembly and the Governor's Office.

Senate composition

Results
Final results from the Iowa Secretary of State:
* indicates incumbent

District 1

District 3

District 5

District 7

District 9

District 11

District 13

District 15

District 17

District 19

District 21

District 23

District 25

District 27

District 29

District 31

District 33

District 35

District 37

District 39

District 41

District 43

District 45

District 47

District 49

See also
 United States House of Representatives elections in Iowa, 2006
Iowa Senate
Iowa House of Representatives
Iowa House of Representatives elections, 2006
Iowa General Assembly
Political party strength in U.S. states

References

2006 Iowa elections
Iowa Senate elections
Iowa State Senate